This list of museums in the San Francisco Bay Area is a list of museums, defined for this context as institutions (including nonprofit organizations, government entities, and private businesses) that collect and care for objects of cultural, artistic, scientific, or historical interest and make their collections or related exhibits available for public viewing. Also included are non-profit and university art galleries. Museums that exist only in cyberspace (i.e., virtual museums) are not included.

Museums

San Francisco

East Bay Area

San Francisco Peninsula

Santa Clara Valley
Entries in this list are generally according to Santa Clara Valley.

Other San Francisco Bay Area

Defunct museums

See also

 List of attractions in Silicon Valley

References

External links

 California State Association of Counties (CSAC)

Lists of museums in California
 
Tourist attractions in the San Francisco Bay Area
 
 
 
 
 
 
 
 
San Francisco Bay Area-related lists